"I'll Whip Ya Head Boy" is a song by American hip hop recording artist 50 Cent, released as the fourth and final single from the soundtrack to the film Get Rich or Die Tryin'. The song features Young Buck and is the closing track on the album. It is played in the intro of the film. The official remix features M.O.P. and was released as a promo single to USA radio stations.

Remixes
 "I'll Whip Ya Head Boy (Remix)" (feat. Young Buck and M.O.P.)
 "We Get That Bread" (feat. Young Buck, Lil Wayne and Juelz Santana)
 "Get That Bread" (Cassidy)
 "I'll Whip Ya Head Boy (Remix) (feat. Young Buck & Agallah)
 "Roger That" (Lil Wayne featuring Javon Black & Young Jeezy)

Chart positions

References

50 Cent songs
2005 singles
Song recordings produced by Ron Browz
Songs written by Ron Browz
2005 songs
G-Unit Records singles
Young Buck songs
M.O.P. songs
Songs written by Young Buck
Songs written by 50 Cent